Laurel Lake is an unincorporated community and census-designated place (CDP) located within Commercial Township, in Cumberland County, New Jersey, United States. It is part of the Vineland-Millville-Bridgeton Primary Metropolitan Statistical Area for statistical purposes. As of the 2010 United States Census, the CDP's population was 2,989.

Geography
According to the United States Census Bureau, the CDP had a total area of 1.863 square miles (4.827 km2), including 1.740 square miles (4.508 km2) of land and 0.123 square miles (0.319 km2) of water (6.61%).

Demographics

Census 2010

Census 2000
As of the 2000 United States Census there were 2,929 people, 1,078 households, and 767 families living in the CDP. The population density was 642.6/km2 (1,663.3/mi2). There were 1,240 housing units at an average density of 272.0/km2 (704.1/mi2). The racial makeup of the CDP was 95.05% White, 1.74% African American, 0.41% Native American, 0.14% Asian, 0.03% Pacific Islander, 0.82% from other races, and 1.81% from two or more races. Hispanic or Latino of any race were 4.30% of the population.

There were 1,078 households, out of which 37.8% had children under the age of 18 living with them, 46.3% were married couples living together, 16.1% had a female householder with no husband present, and 28.8% were non-families. 22.8% of all households were made up of individuals, and 8.3% had someone living alone who was 65 years of age or older. The average household size was 2.72 and the average family size was 3.13.

In the CDP the population was spread out, with 28.8% under the age of 18, 10.1% from 18 to 24, 30.5% from 25 to 44, 19.7% from 45 to 64, and 10.8% who were 65 years of age or older. The median age was 32 years. For every 100 females, there were 98.7 males. For every 100 females age 18 and over, there were 96.6 males.

The median income for a household in the CDP was $32,041, and the median income for a family was $32,432. Males had a median income of $33,299 versus $21,048 for females. The per capita income for the CDP was $12,965. About 15.7% of families and 17.8% of the population were below the poverty line, including 22.8% of those under age 18 and 19.6% of those age 65 or over.

References

Census-designated places in Cumberland County, New Jersey
Commercial Township, New Jersey